Albertina da Cruz Kassoma (born 12 June 1996) is an Angolan handball player for  CS Rapid București (handball)  and the Angolan national team.

She represented Angola at the 2013 World Women's Handball Championship in Serbia and at the 2016 Summer Olympics.

In 2018, she was named the best player at the African Women's Handball Championship.

Achievements 
Carpathian Trophy:
Winner: 2019

Individual awards
 Carpathian Trophy Best Defender: 2019

References

External links

Angolan female handball players
Olympic handball players of Angola
Handball players at the 2016 Summer Olympics
1996 births
Living people
Sportspeople from Praia
Handball players at the 2020 Summer Olympics
African Games medalists in handball
African Games gold medalists for Angola
Competitors at the 2019 African Games